Money Miss Road is a 2022 Nigerian action-comedy movie produced by Joy Odiete, under the collaboration of The Blue Pictures Entertainment, Codeo Limited and The Nollywood Factory. It was directed by Obi Emelonye, a well known Producer of thriller movies like Last Flight to Abuja and Mirror Boy. The film that starred Jidekene Achufusi, Josh Alfred and Charly Boy will be released on 22 July 2022 and will be seen in different cinemas in Nigeria, Europe, US and Canada

Synopsis 
The movie revolves around the lives of two friends, Josiah (Josh2funny) and Joseph ( Jide Achufusi) whose their accidental encounter with a criminal warlord Diokpa (Charly Boy) gave them a life of luxury and misery as they battle for survival.

Reception
According to premium times, money miss road was overstretched by the producer in their description of action comedy. The movie was critiqued on its nudity in a family theme plot, also the poor play at the humor and lastly, it was a water downed action.

Cast 
Jide Kene Achufusi, Melvin Oduah, Josh2Funny and Charly Boy.

References

External links 
 

Nigerian action comedy films
2022 films
English-language Nigerian films
2020s English-language films
2022 action comedy films